Sandwich High School is a public high school located in East Sandwich, Massachusetts, United States. The school serves the students of Sandwich, Massachusetts. Enrollment at the school is about 700 students in grades 9–12, and employs 85 faculty members. Sandwich's school mascot is the Blue Knight and the school colors are Navy, Sky Blue & White. The building is also home to S.T.E.M. Academy, which enrolls about 600 students in grades 7–8.

Athletics
The Blue Knights are a Division 2 school, with some sports in Division 1 and 3. They participate in the Cape & Islands League of the MIAA. The most successful teams at the school are field hockey, golf, cross country, track, and boys' soccer. The boys' hockey team won the D-II State Championship in 2008. They defeated Wilmington by a score of 1–0.

 The football team plays neighboring Mashpee on the annual Thanksgiving Day Football Game, the Cranberry Friendship Bowl. The Blue Knights last won in 2015. This Thanksgiving football game is one of the best for students and town members to attend.
The DeConto Memorial Stadium was finished in the spring of 2015. The stadium is dedicated to Gerald F. Deconto who died in 9/11 attacks. His hometown was Sandwich.

One of the most famous hockey events of the year is known as the Canal Cup. The Canal Cup is a yearly game with the Sandwich Blue Knights against Bourne's Canal men.

Notable alumni
 Sam Brown
 Duff Goldman
 Thornton Burgess

References

Schools in Barnstable County, Massachusetts
Buildings and structures in Sandwich, Massachusetts
Public high schools in Massachusetts